Adi is a title used by Fijian women of chiefly rank, namely female members of chiefly clans.  It is the equivalent of the Ratu title used by male chiefs.  It is in general use throughout most of Fiji, although on Kadavu Island, Bulou is used instead.

Notable chiefesses
Elizabeth II

See also
 

Fijian chiefesses
Noble titles
Women by social class